Andronikos Palaiologos or Andronicus Palaeologus may refer to:

 Andronikos Doukas Palaiologos ( 1183/85 –  1115/18), governor of Thessalonica under Alexios I
 Andronikos Palaiologos (late 12th century) (fl. 1185–1191), general
 Andronikos Palaiologos (son-in-law of Theodore I) (fl. 1211), briefly heir-apparent of the Empire of Nicaea
 Andronikos Palaiologos (megas domestikos), father of Michael VIII Palaiologos
 Andronikos Palaiologos (died 1279/80), nephew or cousin of Michael VIII Palaiologos
 Andronikos II Palaiologos (1259–1332), Byzantine emperor from 1282 to 1328
 Andronikos Palaiologos (fl. 1320s), general during the civil war of 1321–28
 Andronikos Angelos Palaiologos (fl. 1326/8), Byzantine lord of Berat under Andronikos II
 Andronikos III Palaiologos (1297–1341), Byzantine emperor from 1321 to 1341, sole emperor from 1328
 Andronikos Palaiologos (died 1344), general during the civil war of 1341–47
 Andronikos IV Palaiologos (1348–1385), Byzantine emperor from 1376 to 1379
 Andronikos V Palaiologos ( 1400–1407), son of John VII Palaiologos, co-emperor from c. 1403 to his death
 Andronikos Palaiologos (son of Manuel II) (1404–1428), son of Manuel II Palaiologos, governor of Thessalonica from 1408 to 1423
 Andronikos Palaiologos Kantakouzenos (died 1453), last Grand Domestic of the Byzantine Empire